Marion Knobba is an East German sprint canoer who competed in the mid-1960s. She won a bronze medal in the K-4 500 m event at the 1963 ICF Canoe Sprint World Championships in Jajce.

References

East German female canoeists
Living people
Year of birth missing (living people)
ICF Canoe Sprint World Championships medalists in kayak